Saginaw is an unincorporated community 2.5 miles north of Calera in Shelby County, Alabama, United States with zip code 35137. It is part of the Birmingham-Hoover-Cullman Combined Statistical Area. It is located southeast of Alabaster on the east side of Interstate 65 at the intersection of State Route 70 and U.S. Route 31.

Saginaw is the home of the Saginaw Pipe Company, Inc., a major supplier of steel pipe, beams, tubing, and plate. The Dravo Lime Company quarry in Saginaw was honored for their outstanding safety record in the annual Sentinels of Safety awards program co-sponsored by the Mine Safety and Health Administration (MSHA) and the National Mining Association (NMA) in 1997 and 1999.

Demographics

2000 Census data
The U.S. Census bureau does not keep separate statistics for Saginaw. As of the census of 2000, for Block Group 2, Census Tract 306.09, Shelby County, Alabama, which is the census block group that includes the center of Saginaw, the total population was 1,684 people, with a racial makeup of 97.1% white, 2.2% black, and 0.7% mixed or other races.

References

External links 
All Places.us
ePodunk listings

Unincorporated communities in Alabama
Unincorporated communities in Shelby County, Alabama
Birmingham metropolitan area, Alabama